Ganges was a brig launched at Bombay Dockyard for the Bengal Pilot Service, of the British East India Company (EIC). (She is sometimes referred to as a schooner, but that is more a reference to her role than her sailing rig.) She was burnt in Saugor Roads on 11 January 1797, or 11 January 1799. The accidental fire spread to the powder magazine and the explosion killed eight men. Forty men took to her boat, and 59 to a hastily constructed raft. Six hours after the men took to the raft Laurel rescued all the survivors.

Citations and references
Citations

References
 
 
 

1794 ships
Ships of the British East India Company
Maritime incidents in 1797
Maritime incidents in 1799
British ships built in India
Ship fires
Shipwrecks in rivers
Shipwrecks of India